The Apatin Open is an annual darts tournament on the WDF circuit that began in 2010.

List of tournaments

Men's

Women's

Women's

References

Darts tournaments
Darts in Serbia
Recurring sporting events established in 2010
2010 establishments in Serbia